Kerry Thompson-Moore is a female former English field hockey player. She was a member of the England women's national field hockey team from 1997 to 2005.

She represented England and won a silver medal, at the 1998 Commonwealth Games in Kuala Lumpur. She also competed at the 1998 Women's Hockey World Cup.

References 

Living people
English female field hockey players
Field hockey players at the 1998 Commonwealth Games
Commonwealth Games silver medallists for England
Commonwealth Games medallists in field hockey
1978 births
Medallists at the 1998 Commonwealth Games